Denise Jones may refer to:

 Denise Jones (gymnast), British Olympic gymnast
 Denise Jones (singer), singer with Point of Grace
 Denise Idris Jones, Welsh politician